Burlison may refer to:

People with the surname
 Bill Burlison (1931–2019), American lawyer and politician
 Bob Burlison, English footballer
 Paul Burlison, American rockabilly guitarist
 Thomas Henry Burlison, British footballer and trades unionist

Places
 Burlison, Tennessee, United States